The LSU–Alexandria Generals (or LSUA Generals) are the athletic teams that represent Louisiana State University of Alexandria, located in Alexandria, Louisiana, in intercollegiate sports as a member of the National Association of Intercollegiate Athletics (NAIA), primarily competing in the Red River Athletic Conference (RRAC) since the 2014–15 academic year. The Generals previously competed as an NAIA Independent within the Association of Independent Institutions (AII) from 2007–08 to 2013–14.

Varsity teams 
LSUA competes in seven intercollegiate varsity sports. Men's sports include baseball, basketball and soccer; while women's sports include basketball, soccer, softball and tennis. Club sports include cheerleading and rodeo.

Baseball
The LSU–Alexandria Generals baseball team represents Louisiana State University of Alexandria. The school's team currently competes in the Red River Athletic Conference, which is part of the National Association of Intercollegiate Athletics. The team plays home games at the Generals Baseball Field.

LSU–Alexandria has had 2 Major League Baseball Draft selection since the draft began in 1965.

Men's basketball
The LSU–Alexandria Generals men's basketball team represents Louisiana State University of Alexandria. The school's team currently competes in the RRAC, which is part of the NAIA. The team plays home games at the LSUA Fitness Center.

Women's basketball
The LSU–Alexandria Generals women's basketball team represents Louisiana State University of Alexandria. The school's team currently competes in the RRAC, which is part of the NAIA. The team plays home games at the LSUA Fitness Center.

References

External links